Robert or Bob Skinner may refer to: 

Robert Skinner (bishop) (1591–1670), English bishop of (successively) Bristol, Oxford, and Worcester
Robert Peet Skinner (1866–1960), U.S. diplomat
Robert T. Skinner (1867–1946), Scottish mathematician, historical author and antiquarian
Bob Skinner (born 1931), American baseball player
Bob Skinner, fictional Scottish policeman in the novels of Quintin Jardine